Jerry Michael Melillo (born 1943) is a Distinguished Scientist at the Marine Biological Laboratory and a professor of biology at Brown University. In 2014, he was elected a member of the National Academy of Sciences.

Melillo attended Wesleyan University and Yale University.

References

External links 
 Google Scholar profile

1943 births
Living people
Wesleyan University alumni
Yale University alumni
Brown University faculty